The fourth season of the NBC American supernatural drama series Grimm was announced on March 19, 2014. It consisted of 22 episodes. The series, created by David Greenwalt, Jim Kouf and Stephen Carpenter, follows a descendant of the Grimm line, Nick Burkhardt, as he deals with being a cop, and trying not to expose his secret as a Grimm.

Cast

Main cast
 David Giuntoli as Nick Burkhardt
 Russell Hornsby as Hank Griffin
 Bitsie Tulloch as Juliette Silverton
 Silas Weir Mitchell as Monroe
 Reggie Lee as Sergeant Drew Wu
 Sasha Roiz as Captain Sean Renard
 Bree Turner as Rosalee Calvert
 Claire Coffee as Adalind Schade

Recurring cast
 Alexis Denisof as Viktor Chlodwig zu Schellendorf von Konigsburg
 Philip Anthony-Rodriguez as Marcus Rispoli
 Jacqueline Toboni as Theresa "Trubel" Rubel
 Danny Bruno as Rupert "Bud" Ferdinand Wurstner
 Louise Lombard as Elizabeth Lascelles
 Nico Evers-Swindell as Prince Kenneth Alun Goderich Bowes-Lyon
 Garcelle Beauvais as Henrietta
 David Ury as Hofmann
 Elizabeth Rodriguez as Special Agent Chavez
 Will Rothhaar as Officer Jesse Acker
 Lucas Near-Verbrugghe as Josh Porter

Guest stars
 Toni Trucks as Deputy Janelle Farris
 Arnold Vosloo as Jonathon Wilde (Wesen Bounty Hunter)
 Daniel Roebuck as Lieutenant Peter Orson
 Hank Harris as Andrew "Andy" Harrison
 Gideon Emery as Damien Barso
 Brigid Brannagh as Sara Fisher
 Erick Avari as J.P. Turner
 Rebecca Wisocky as Lily Hinkley
 Richard Brake as Nigel Edmund
 Mark Famiglietti as Linus Balouzian
 Jeff Fahey as Albert Bowden
 Eric Lee Huffman as Max McClay
 Matt Kesslar as Sven Gunderson
 Hillary Tuck as Margaret "Maggie" Bowden
Ricki Bhullar as Dix Turner
Khushi Dayao as Suleka Turner
Amitesh Prasad as Sharat
Tarun Shetty as Adesh
Daniel Brockley as Mann
Joseph Gibson aw Man #1
John Srednicki as Paramedic
Tyler Irwin as Unruly Suspect

Production 
NBC CEO Robert Greenblatt confirmed in early 2014 that the chances of renewing the series for a fourth season were very high thanks to the success programming show on Friday nights in the United States: "I think that the genre audience proves to be a very loyal one. We like what we're building on Friday night with 'Grimm'."

On March 19, 2014, NBC announced that the series had been renewed for a fourth season with a 22-episode order. In mid May, NBC announced its official TV show's premiered dates, among which is included the fourth season of Grimm that will air on October 24, 2014.

Casting 
Jacqueline Toboni continues her recurring role as Theresa "Trubel" Rubel, for season four. In mid-July Elizabeth Rodriguez was cast as Special Agent Chavez, a Steinadler and one of four FBI agents assigned to investigate the recent homicide of Weston Steward. Will Rothhaar appeared as Officer Acker, a cop with a dark side, in 3 episodes beginning with episode 8. Toni Trucks will appear as Deputy Janelle Farris in "Highway of Tears"; a sheriff who will help Nick & Hank with an investigation.

Filming
Like the previous three seasons, the majority of filming takes place in the Portland, Oregon area. Filming for the season began on July 16, 2014.

Broadcast
The season aired simultaneously on CTV in Canada. It is currently airing on Universal Channel in Southeast Asia. In Australia, it began airing on Fox8 on January 7, 2015. It premiered on Watch in the United Kingdom and Ireland on January 28, 2015.

Episodes

Ratings

References

2014 American television seasons
2015 American television seasons
Season 4